Nora at the Altar-Rail is a one-act opera by Jay Anthony Gach, to a libretto by Royce Vavrek. The libretto is based on the Book of Genesis and inspired by Thomas Hardy's poem "At the Altar-Rail" which is prominently featured in the piece.

Written while Vavrek and Gach were in residence at the American Lyric Theater, the opera was performed in concert in the Leonard Nimoy Thalia Theatre in the Symphony Space in Manhattan, New York, on 7 January 2008.

Roles and role creators
Nora (soprano), Colleen McGrath
Anders (tenor), Edwin Vega
Lars (baritone), Christopher Burchett

Scenes
Prologue, North Dakota — Nora
Scene 1, The kitchen in the farmhouse — Lars, Nora
Scene 2, The bookstore in town — Anders, Nora
Scene 3, The living room in the farm house Lars, Nora
Duration: 20 minutes.

References

External links
 Thomas Hardy: Satires Of Circumstance: IX. "At the Altar-Rail"
 Score of Nora at the Altar-Rail (vocal parts and piano accompaniment

Operas
English-language operas
2008 operas
One-act operas